Orlovka is a rural locality (a village) in Annovsky Selsoviet, Belebeyevsky District, Bashkortostan, Russia. The population was 4 as of 2010. There is 1 street.

Geography 
Orlovka is located 24 km north of Belebey (the district's administrative centre) by road. Savkino is the nearest rural locality.

References 

Rural localities in Belebeyevsky District